Patrice Perrot (born 24 February 1964 in Decize) is a French entrepreneur and politician of La République En Marche! (LREM) and Territories of Progress (TDP) who has been serving as a member of the French National Assembly since the 2017 elections, representing the department of Nièvre. He represents Nièvre's 2nd constituency.

Political career
In parliament, Perrot serves on the Committee on Sustainable Development and Spatial Planning.

In July 2019, Perrot decided not to align with his parliamentary group's majority and became one of 52 LREM members who abstained from a vote on the French ratification of the European Union’s Comprehensive Economic and Trade Agreement (CETA) with Canada.

See also
 2017 French legislative election

References

1964 births
Living people
People from Nièvre
La République En Marche! politicians
Territories of Progress politicians
Deputies of the 15th National Assembly of the French Fifth Republic
Deputies of the 16th National Assembly of the French Fifth Republic